The West Branch Eastern River is a  tributary of the Eastern River in Maine. It is part of the Kennebec River watershed.  The West Branch begins near South Windsor and flows southwest through the town of Whitefield, joining the East Branch at East Pittston to form the Eastern River.

See also
List of rivers of Maine

References

Maine Streamflow Data from the USGS
Maine Watershed Data From Environmental Protection Agency

Tributaries of the Kennebec River
Rivers of Maine
Rivers of Kennebec County, Maine
Rivers of Lincoln County, Maine